United Nations Security Council Resolution 235, adopted on June 9, 1967, after noting that the governments of both Israel and Syria have accepted the Council's demand for a cease-fire, the Council demanded that hostilities should cease forthwith and requested that the Secretary-General make immediate contacts with the Governments of Israel and Syria to immediately arrange compliance with the cease-fire and to report to the Security Council within 2 hours of the resolution.

The meeting, requested by the Soviet Union and United States, adopted the resolution unanimously. The same day, Syria and Israel accepted the terms of the resolution.

See also
List of United Nations Security Council Resolutions 201 to 300 (1965–1971)
Six-Day War

References

External links
 
Text of the Resolution at undocs.org

 0235
Israeli–Palestinian conflict and the United Nations
1967 in Syria
Six-Day War
 0235
June 1967 events